The 1982 Badminton World Cup was the fourth edition of an international tournament Badminton World Cup. The event was held in Kuala Lumpur, Malaysia from 15 September to 19 September 1982. Competitions for doubles were not conducted. Indonesia won men's singles event while Denmark won women's singles event.

Medalists

Men's singles

Women's singles

References 
 https://web.archive.org/web/20061214225151/http://tangkis.tripod.com/world/1982.htm
 
 Swie King Reigns
 Prakash submits to Misbun magic

Badminton World Cup
1982 in badminton
1982 in Malaysian sport
Sport in Kuala Lumpur
International sports competitions hosted by Malaysia